Dual specificity protein kinase TTK also known as Mps1 is an enzyme that in humans is encoded by the TTK gene.

References

Further reading

EC 2.7.11